Fidelis Duker is a Nigerian filmmaker and film festival organiser.

Career 
Duker started his career in the year 1988 writing dramas for NTA, Nigeria's public broadcast television network.

In 2003, Duker birthed the idea of the Abuja International Film Festival (AIFF), one of Africa's biggest and longest-running film festivals held yearly in Abuja of Nigeria, for which he sits on the board as the Founder of the event holding for its 18th time in 2021.

Nominations and awards 
In 2016, Duker won a ‘Lifetime Achievement Award,’ at the Best of Nollywood Award (BON) held in Aba.

Filmography 
Ese Atijo – Yoruba – 1993
Skeleton – Igbo – 1994
Nemesis – English – 1995
Not My Will – English – 1996
Nemesis 2 –  English - 1996
Scandals – English - 1997
Destined To Die 1 – English – 1997
Scandals 2 – English - 1998
Destined To Die 2 – English - 1998 
Blood Brothers –  English - 1998
Visa To Hell – English - 1999
King Of Money –  English - 1999
Doctor Death  - English - 2000
Enemy Within  - English – 2001
Pure Love – English - 2002
Hot Passion – English – 2002
Baka Boys – English - 2003
Night Nurses  - English - 2003
Jesu Mushin – English – 2004 
Paradise In America - 2005
London Blues – English – 2006
A Means To An End – English  2007
Senseless – English - 2008 starring Segun Arinze, Bimbo Akintola, Kanayo Kanayo, Femi Branch, Ngozi Ezeonu
Cash And Carry – English - 2009
Asiri Ile – Yoruba -  2009
Onyeama – Igbo – 2010 
Sade Oloso – Yoruba - 2011
Dada Oni Paki – Yoruba -  2012

TV productions 
Images – TV series – 2001
Eldorado – TV series – 2005
Girls Next Door – 2007
Kids Alone – 2008

References 

Year of birth missing (living people)
Living people
Nigerian Roman Catholics
Nigerian film producers
Nigerian television writers
Nigerian film directors
Nigerian television producers